Patience Itanyi (born 2 July 1973) is a Nigerian athlete. She competed in the women's long jump at the 2000 Summer Olympics.

References

External links
 

1973 births
Living people
Nigerian female long jumpers
Olympic athletes of Nigeria
Athletes (track and field) at the 2000 Summer Olympics
Place of birth missing (living people)
Nigerian heptathletes
Universiade bronze medalists for Nigeria
Universiade medalists in athletics (track and field)
African Games medalists in athletics (track and field)
African Games silver medalists for Nigeria
African Games bronze medalists for Nigeria
Athletes (track and field) at the 1995 All-Africa Games
Athletes (track and field) at the 1999 All-Africa Games
20th-century Nigerian women
21st-century Nigerian women